The Guinness Brewmasters are animated advertising icons of Guinness beer used since 2004.

One is an inventor, constantly introducing his inventions to the other, who responds unequivocally to every invention with an enthusiastic "Brilliant!"  The other than often responds with a just-as-enthusiastic "Brilliant!", and the two then clink their Guinness beers. Such inventions have included sliced bread, the little black book, the six-pack, suntan lotion, scented candles, and Irish stepdancing.

External links
 Guinness
 Guinness 1759 Society: Brewmaster bloopers

Diageo
Guinness advertising